The 1981–82 Czechoslovak Extraliga season was the 39th season of the Czechoslovak Extraliga, the top level of ice hockey in Czechoslovakia. 12 teams participated in the league, and Dukla Jihlava won the championship.

Regular season

1. Liga-Qualification 
 Meochema Přerov – Slovan CHZJD Bratislava 0:3 (4:7, 1:10, 1:7)

External links
History of Czechoslovak ice hockey

Czechoslovak Extraliga seasons
Czech
1981–82 in Czechoslovak ice hockey